E haplogroup or Haplogroup E may refer to:

 Haplogroup E-M96 (Y-DNA)
 Haplogroup E (mtDNA)